Blažena Knittlová  (born 8 February 1931) was a pairs figure skater who competed for Czechoslovakia.  With partner Karel Vosátka, she won the silver medal at the European Figure Skating Championships in 1948 and finished 16th at the 1948 Winter Olympics.

Results
(pairs with Karel Vosátka)

References

External links
 Sports-reference profile
  

1931 births
Possibly living people
Czechoslovak female pair skaters
Olympic figure skaters of Czechoslovakia
Figure skaters at the 1948 Winter Olympics
European Figure Skating Championships medalists